No Kill No Beep Beep is the debut album by Q and Not U. It was released on October 24, 2000. The album brought a slightly groovier, more dance-oriented sound to the Dischord label.

Production
It was produced and engineered by Ian MacKaye and Don Zientara.  The photography is by Shawn Brackbill.

Critical reception
The Washington Post wrote that "for all of Q and Not U's competence and energy, No Kill No Beep Beep is so coy and tangential that it ends up in the same place it began."

Track listing
 "A Line in the Sand" – 3:05
 "End the Washington Monument (Blinks) Goodnight" – 2:21
 "Fever Sleeves" – 2:44
 "Hooray for Humans" – 3:12
 "Kiss Distinctly American" – 5:05
 "We Heart Our Hive" – 4:36
 "Little Sparkee" – 2:06
 "The More I Get the More I Want" – 4:07
 "Y Plus White Girl" – 2:39
 "Nine Things Everybody Knows" – 4:22
 "Sleeping the Terror Code" – 5:19

References

2000 albums
Dischord Records albums
Q and Not U albums